Kärdla Airport is an airport in Estonia.

The runway was upgraded in 1998.

Overview
Kärdla Airport opened in 1963. During the next years there was fairly high activity at the airport, with regular flights to Tallinn, Haapsalu, Vormsi, Kuressaare, Riga, Pärnu, Viljandi, and Tartu, and charter flights to Murmansk, Vilnius, and Kaunas. 24,335 passengers travelled via Kärdla Airport in 1987. Air traffic sank dramatically after Estonia became independent in 1991, and in 1995, only 727 passengers traveled via the airport. Since then, traffic has increased, and 10,551 passengers travelled via the airport in 2010.

The airport has annual Flight Days in the first weekend of August.

On November 23, 2001, two died after an Antonov An-28 crashed en route to Kärdla. An investigation found that pilot error was the cause, but a court later ruled that bad weather – not the pilot – was responsible for the crash.

Airlines and destinations

Statistics
List of the busiest airports in the Baltic states

References

External links
 Welcome to Hiiumaa!
 Official website

Airports built in the Soviet Union
Airports in Estonia
Buildings and structures in Hiiu County
1963 establishments in Estonia
Hiiumaa Parish